Idionella is a genus of North American dwarf spiders that was first described by Nathan Banks in 1893.

Species
 it contains eight species and one subspecies, found in Mexico and the United States:
Idionella anomala (Gertsch & Ivie, 1936) – USA
Idionella deserta (Gertsch & Ivie, 1936) – USA
Idionella formosa (Banks, 1892) (type) – USA
Idionella f. pista (Chamberlin, 1949) – USA
Idionella nesiotes (Crosby, 1924) – USA, Mexico
Idionella rugosa (Crosby, 1905) – USA
Idionella sclerata (Ivie & Barrows, 1935) – USA, Mexico
Idionella titivillitium (Crosby & Bishop, 1925) – USA
Idionella tugana (Chamberlin, 1949) – USA

See also
 List of Linyphiidae species (I–P)

References

Araneomorphae genera
Linyphiidae
Spiders of Mexico
Spiders of the United States
Taxa named by Nathan Banks